Johann Karl Wilhelm Illiger (19 November 1775 – 10 May 1813) was a German entomologist and zoologist.

Illiger was the son of a merchant in Braunschweig. He studied under the entomologist Johann Hellwig, and later worked on the zoological collections of Johann Centurius Hoffmannsegg.  Illiger was professor and director of the "zoological museum" (which is the Natural History Museum of Berlin in the present day) from its formation in 1810 until his death.
 
He was the author of Prodromus systematis mammalium et avium (1811), which was an overhaul of the Linnaean system. It was a major influence on the adoption of the concept of the family. He also edited the  Magazin für Insektenkunde, widely known as "Illiger's Magazine".

In 1811 he introduced the taxonomic order Proboscidea for elephants, the American mastodon and the woolly mammoth. He also described the subspecies Odobenus rosmarus divergens, commonly known as the Pacific walrus. Illiger's macaw (Promolius maracana; Vieillot, 1816) and Illiger's saddle-back tamarin (Saguinus fuscicollis illigeri; Pucheran, 1845) commemorate his name. The botanical genus Illigera (family Hernandiaceae) also bears his name.

Published works 
 Beschreibung einiger neuer Käfer, in: Schneider's entomologisches Magazin (1794) – Description of a new beetle.
Nachricht von einer in etlichten Gersten- und Haferfeldern um Braunschweig wahrscheinlich durch Insecten verursachten Verheerung, in: Brauschweigisches Magazin 50 (1795) – News about barley and oat fields near Braunschweig likely devastated by insects.
Verzeichniß der Käfer Preußens; outlined by Johann Gottlieb Kugelann (1798) – Directory of beetles found in Prussia.
Die Wurmtrocknis des Harzes, in: Braunschweigisches Magazin 49-50 (1798) – Bark beetles found in resin.
Die Erdmandel, in: Braunschweigisches Magazin 2 (1799) – The nutsedge.
Versuch einer systematischen vollständigen Terminologie für das Thierreich und Pflanzenreich (1800) – About a systematic complete terminology for the animal and plant kingdoms. 
Zusätze und Berichte zu Fabricius Systema Eleutheratorum. Magazin fur Insektenkunde 1. viii + 492 pp. (1802) – Additions and comments on Fabricius' "Systema Eleutheratorus". 
Über die südamerikanischen Gürtelthiere, in: Wiedemann's Archiv für die Zoologie (1804) – About the South American armadillo.
Die wilden Pferde in Amerika, in: Braunschweigisches Magazin 7/(1805) – Wild horses in America.
Nachricht von dem Hornvieh in Paraguay in Südamerika, in: Braunschweigisches Magazin 15-16 (1805) – On horned cattle of Paraguay.
Nachlese zu den Bemerkungen, Berichtigungen und Zusätzen zu Fabricii Systema Eleutheratorum; Mag. fur Insektenkunde. 6:296-317 (1807) – Information regarding the comments, corrections and additions to Fabricius' "Systema Eleutheratorum".
Vorschlag zur Aufnahme im Fabricischen Systeme fehlender Käfergattungen. Magazin für Insektenkunde 6:318-350 (1807). 
Prodromus Systematis Mammalium et Avium (1811).
Überblick der Säugthiere nach ihrer Vertheilung über die Welttheile. Abh. K. Akad. Wiss. Berlin, 1804-1811: 39-159 (1815) – Overview of quadrupeds according to their distribution throughout the world.

References
Wilhelm Heß: Illiger, Johann Karl Wilhelm. In: ''Allgemeine Deutsche Biographie. Band 14, Duncker & Humblot, Leipzig 1881, S. 23–27.

External links
 
 
  Gaedike, R.; Groll, E. K. & Taeger, A. 2012: Bibliography of the entomological literature from the beginning until 1863 : online database - version 1.0 - Senckenberg Deutsches Entomologisches Institut.—Bibliography.

18th-century German zoologists
German entomologists
1775 births
1813 deaths
German ornithologists
German mammalogists
Scientists from Braunschweig
People from the Duchy of Brunswick
19th-century German zoologists